KBDE may refer to:

 KBDE (FM), a radio station (89.9 FM) licensed to Temple, Texas, United States
 the ICAO code for Baudette International Airport